Victoria was a federal electoral district in Nova Scotia, Canada, that was represented in the House of Commons of Canada from 1867 to 1904. It was created by the British North America Act, 1867. It consisted of the County of Victoria. It was abolished in 1903 when it was merged into North Cape Breton and Victoria electoral district.

Members of Parliament
This riding elected the following Members of Parliament:

Election results

See also 
 List of Canadian federal electoral districts
 Past Canadian electoral districts

External links 
 Riding history for Victoria (1867–1903) from the Library of Parliament

Former federal electoral districts of Nova Scotia